Babskoye Tatarovo is a rural locality (a village) in Mstyora Urban Settlement, Vyaznikovsky District, Vladimir Oblast, Russia. The population was 1,249 as of 2010. There are 14 streets.

Geography 
Babskoye Tatarovo is located on the Mstyorka River, 26 km northwest of Vyazniki (the district's administrative centre) by road. Kozlovka is the nearest rural locality.

References 

Rural localities in Vyaznikovsky District